Trevor Robinson (born 20 September 1984) is a Jamaican former footballer who played as a midfielder. He played for Cambridge United.

External links

1984 births
Living people
Jamaican footballers
Association football midfielders
Millwall F.C. players
Tamworth F.C. players
Cambridge United F.C. players
English Football League players
National League (English football) players
People from Saint Catherine Parish